Barbara Ferm is an American World Champion bridge player. She won the Mixed Teams event in Wroclaw in 2022.

Bridge accomplishments

Wins

 World Bridge Series Mixed Teams (1) 2022

Runners-up
 North American Bridge Championships (1)
 Machlin Women's Swiss Teams (1) 2015

References

External links
 
 

American contract bridge players
Living people
Year of birth missing (living people)
Place of birth missing (living people)